Ilyocryptidae is a family of crustaceans belonging to the order Diplostraca.

Genera:
 Ilyocryptus Sars, 1861

References

Diplostraca
Crustacean families